Yar-e Hoseyn (also Romanized as Yār-e Ḩoseyn) is a village in Teshkan Rural District, Chegeni District, Dowreh County, Lorestan Province, Iran. At the 2006 census, its population was 69, in 16 families.

References 

Towns and villages in Dowreh County